The Ffestiniog Railway 0-4-0TT were six  steam locomotives built by George England and Co. for the Ffestiniog Railway between 1863 and 1867. The locomotives were built to two designs: the first four were originally side tank locomotives and are collectively known as the Small England class; the final two locomotives were delivered with saddle tanks and are known as the Large England class.

The designation "TT" indicates a tender-tank locomotive, which is a tank locomotive with a tender. In these locomotives, water is carried in tanks on the locomotive while fuel (coal) is carried in the tender.

Small England class
The Ffestiniog Railway was originally built to be worked by gravity, with horses used to haul the empty slate wagons uphill from Porthmadog to Blaenau Ffestiniog. By the late 1850s it was clear that the line was reaching its carrying capacity, while the production from the slate quarries was continuing to expand. To increase the amount of slate that could be carried by the railway. In order to increase capacity, in 1860 the board began investigating the use of steam locomotives for the railway. Although steam had been used on narrow gauge railways before this, it had only rarely been used on a gauge as narrow as the Ffestiniog's.

In 1862, the railway advertised in The Locomotive magazine asking for manufacturers to bid to supply an  locomotive to the railway. Although they received 29 expressions of interest, none were accepted. Charles Menzies Holland was acting as locomotive designer for the Ffestiniog Railway and he approached George England who lived near him in London. England agreed to bid for the contract and in February 1863 he proposed building three  locomotives primarily to his own design. This bid was accepted and construction began. England's design was for a small  locomotive with side tanks and tender. The locomotives had a low center of gravity and were extremely small to fit within the restricted loading gauge of the railway.

The first two locomotives Mountaineer and The Princess arrived in July 1863. They were delivered without domes, over the objection of England. As a result, they suffered badly from priming and domes were hastily fitted in Wales before the locomotives could be run on service trains. The first formal steam-hauled train on the Festiniog Railway ran on 23 October 1863.

A fourth locomotive was added to the order and The Prince and Palmerston arrived in 1864. These were to the same basic design as the first two locomotives, but were delivered with domes already fitted. The introduction of the initial locomotives was a great success, allowing the railway to handle the increasing slate traffic and its first formal passenger trains.

Large England class

By 1867, traffic on the Festiniog Railway had outgrown the capabilities of the four new Small Englands, so an order for two further locomotives was placed with George England and Co. In the light of the experience with the initial class, these two new locomotives were built to a larger and improved design and they are known as the Large England class. Welsh Pony and Little Giant were delivered in 1867 and had saddle tanks fitted instead of side tanks. They also had a longer wheelbase and larger driving wheels than the Small Englands, to counteract the smaller locomotives' "violent vertical oscillations".

New Builds
In September 2019, a modern replica of Mountaineer was announced. Mountaineer III will be built to the as delivered appearance of the Small Englands with side tanks instead of a saddle tank. The locomotive boiler completed a hydraulic pressure test in May 2020.

See also
 List of Ffestiniog Railway rolling stock

References

External links
 Festipedia page on Festiniog Railway locomotives

Ffestiniog Railway
Preserved narrow gauge steam locomotives of Great Britain
George England and Company locomotives
0-4-0 locomotives
Railway locomotives introduced in 1863